J-Walk (Hangul: 제이워크) is a South Korean musical duo formed by two Sechs Kies members. As of 2016, they are under YG Entertainment after reunited with their group Sechs Kies in the label.

Members 
 Jang Suwon (장수원) - vocals
 Kim Jaeduck (김재덕) - choreography & rap

History 
After Sechskies had disbanded in 2000, 2 years later, Kim Jaeduck and Jang Suwon formed a duet under Kiss Entertainment, releasing two albums in 2002. Their debut hit "Suddenly" was very popular among fans, and it went as high as No. 2 on the music charts. However, their follow up album "Someday" was not as successful. They won SBS Gayo Daejeon Popularity Award with former Sechs Kies member Kang Sunghun in 2002.

there were talks of releasing a third album for J-Walk. In 2007, they signed with Vitamin Entertainment and released first mini albums Sun Shower(여우비)after a five-year hiatus. They held a showcase of its new album in Seoul in October 2007. Eun Jiwon and Lee Jaijin joined it onstage to congratulate their comeback.

In June 2008, J-Walk collaborated with their former Sechskies leader Eun Jiwon for a new song called "My Love" in the third album. Since Kim Jaeduck entered the military shortly after, Suwon had to promote the album by himself. Suwon entered the military in December 2009 and He was released from the army in October 2011.

After they were discharged from army, J-Walk has signed under A&G Modes and released some digital songs. They returned with mini album "Love...Painfully" with main track "Strive" in December 2013. During preparing for a new album comeback, they made the difficult decision to adjust their schedule to join past label DSP Media’s first family concert “DSP Festival” with Eun jiwon on December 14.

In October 2019, YG Entertainment released the duo autumn photo album.

Discography

Albums 
 Suddenly (2002)
 Someday (2002)
 My Love (2008)

EPs 
 J-Walk 2007 Mini Album (2007)
 Love...Painfully (2013)

Digital singles 
 "안타까워" ("Shame"), 2008
 "사랑한다 외쳐요" ("Shout Out Love"), 2009
 "Get On The Floor", 2011 (under the name "J-Walk Kim Jae Duc")
 "프라프치노" ("Frappuccino"), 2013
 "첫눈오는 날" ("First Snow"), 2013
 "무슨말이 필요해" ("What More Can I Say"), 2014 (with Jui (주이))
 "비나이다" ("I Beg You"), 2014

Soundtrack 
 Against(반) (OST of Take Care of Us, Captain), 2012

Awards

References

External links 
 

South Korean boy bands
K-pop music groups